Quinazoline is an organic compound with the formula C8H6N2. It is an aromatic heterocycle with a bicyclic structure consisting of two fused six-membered aromatic rings, a benzene ring and a pyrimidine ring.  It is a light yellow crystalline solid that is soluble in water. Also known as 1,3-diazanaphthalene, quinazoline received its name from being an aza derivative of quinoline. Though the parent quinazoline molecule is rarely mentioned by itself in technical literature, substituted derivatives have been synthesized for medicinal purposes such as antimalarial and anticancer agents.  Quinazoline is a planar molecule. It is isomeric with the other diazanaphthalenes of the benzodiazine subgroup: cinnoline, quinoxaline, and phthalazine. Over 200 biologically active quinazoline and quinoline alkaloids are identified.

Synthesis

The synthesis of quinazoline was first reported in 1895 by August Bischler and Lang through the decarboxylation of the 2-carboxy derivative (quinazoline-2-carboxylic acid). In 1903, Siegmund Gabriel reported the synthesis of the parent quinazoline from o-nitrobenzylamine, which was reduced with hydrogen iodide and red phosphorus to 2-aminobenzylamine. The reduced intermediate condenses with formic acid to yield dihydroquinazoline, which was oxidized to quinazoline.

Methods have been reviewed. An efficient route to the parent heterocycle proceeds via the 4-chloro derivative to the tosylhydrazide, which is removed by base.

Reactions

Hydration and addition reactions

Quinazoline protonates (and methylates) at N3.  Protonation induces hydration. Many mildly acidic substrates add across the C=N3 bond, these include hydrogen cyanide, sodium bisulfite, and methyl ketones.

Hydrolysis
In warm solution, quinazoline hydrolyzes under acidic and alkaline conditions to 2-aminobenzaldehyde (or the products of its self-condensation) and formic acid and ammonia/ammonium.

Electrophilic and nucleophilic substitution
The pyrimidine ring resists electrophilic substitution, although the 4-position is more reactive than the 2-position. In comparison, the benzene ring is more susceptible to electrophilic substitution. The ring position order of reactivity is 8 > 6 > 5 > 7. 2- and 4-halo derivatives of quinazoline undergo displacement by nucleophiles, such as piperidine.

Biological and pharmacological significance

Gefitinib
In May 2003, the U.S. Food and Drug Administration (FDA) approved the quinazoline gefitinib. The drug, produced by AstraZeneca, is an inhibitor of the protein kinase of epidermal growth factor receptor (EGFR).  It binds to the ATP-binding site of EGFR, thus inactivating the anti-apoptotic Ras signal transduction cascade preventing further growth of cancer cells.

Lapatinib
In March 2007, GlaxoSmithKline's drug lapatinib was approved by the U.S. FDA to treat advanced-stage or metastatic breast cancer in combination with Roche's capecitabine.  Lapatinib eliminates the growth of breast cancer stem cells that cause tumor growth.  The binding of lapatinib to the ATP-binding site in the EGFR and human epidermal growth factor receptor 2 (HER2) protein kinase domains inhibits signal mechanism activation (through reversible, competitive inhibition).

Erlotinib
In May 2013, erlotinib, a drug manufactured by Astellas, was approved by the U.S. FDA to treat NSCLC patients with tumors caused by mutations of EGFR. The binding of erlotinib to the ATP-binding sites of the EGFR receptors prevents EGFR from producing phosphotyrosine residues (due to competitive inhibition), thus rendering the receptor incapable of generating signal cascades to promote cell growth.

Afatinib
In July 2013, the U.S. FDA approved afatinib, a drug developed by Boehringer Ingelheim, as an irreversible, competitive inhibitor of HER2 and EGFR kinases. While afatinib demonstrates a similar mechanism to laptinib in which it acts as an irreversible HER2 and EGFR inhibitor, afatinib has also shown activity against tyrosine kinases that have become resistant to gefinitib and erlotinib.

See also
Quinazolinone
Niementowski quinazoline synthesis

References

 
Aromatic bases
Simple aromatic rings